Artibrannan is a townland in County Antrim, Northern Ireland, near Ballymena. It is situated in the historic barony of Toome Lower and the civil parishes of Ahoghill (by 1851) and Craigs (by 1891) and covers an area of 112 acres.

The name derives from the Irish: Ard tigh(e) Branain (height (or hill) of Branans) or Ard-tighe-Breannain (the height of Brennan's house).

The population of the townland decreased during the 19th century:

See also 
List of townlands in County Antrim

References

Townlands of County Antrim
Barony of Toome Lower